The Battle of Nanking (or Nanjing) was fought in early December 1937 during the Second Sino-Japanese War between the Chinese National Revolutionary Army and the Imperial Japanese Army for control of Nanking (Nanjing), the capital of the Republic of China.

Following the outbreak of war between Japan and China in July 1937, the Japanese government at first attempted to contain the fighting and sought a negotiated settlement to the war. However, after victory in the Battle of Shanghai expansionists prevailed within the Japanese military and on December 1 a campaign to capture Nanking was officially authorized. The task of occupying Nanking was given to General Iwane Matsui, the commander of Japan's Central China Area Army, who believed that the capture of Nanking would force China to surrender and thus end the war. Chinese leader Chiang Kai-shek ultimately decided to defend the city and appointed Tang Shengzhi to command the Nanking Garrison Force, a hastily assembled army of local conscripts and the remnants of the Chinese units who had fought in Shanghai.

Japanese soldiers marched from Shanghai to Nanking at a breakneck pace, rapidly defeating pockets of Chinese resistance. By December 9 they had reached the last line of defense, the Fukuo Line, behind which lay Nanking's fortified walls. On December 10 Matsui ordered an all-out attack on Nanking, and after less than two days of intense fighting Chiang decided to abandon the city. Before fleeing, Tang ordered his men to launch a concerted breakout of the Japanese siege, but by this time Nanking was largely surrounded and its defenses were at the breaking point. Most of Tang's units simply collapsed, their soldiers often casting off their weapons and uniforms in the streets in the hopes of hiding among the city's civilian population.

Following the capture of the city Japanese soldiers massacred Chinese prisoners of war, murdered civilians, and committed acts of looting and rape in an event known as the Nanking Massacre. Though Japan's military victory excited and emboldened them, the subsequent massacre tarnished their reputation in the eyes of the world. Contrary to Matsui's expectations, China did not surrender and the Second Sino-Japanese War continued for another eight years.

Prelude to the battle

Japan's decision to capture Nanking
The conflict which would become known as the Second Sino-Japanese War started on July 7, 1937, with a skirmish at Marco Polo Bridge which escalated rapidly into a full-scale war in northern China between the armies of China and Japan. China, however, wanted to avoid a decisive confrontation in the north and so instead opened a second front by attacking Japanese units in Shanghai in central China. The Japanese responded by dispatching the Shanghai Expeditionary Army (SEA), commanded by General Iwane Matsui, to drive the Chinese Army from Shanghai. Intense fighting in Shanghai forced Japan's Army General Staff, which was in charge of military operations, to repeatedly reinforce the SEA, and finally on November 9 an entirely new army, the 10th Army commanded by Lieutenant General Heisuke Yanagawa, was also landed at Hangzhou Bay just south of Shanghai.

Although the arrival of the 10th Army succeeded at forcing the Chinese Army to retreat from Shanghai, the Japanese Army General Staff had decided to adopt a policy of non-expansion of hostilities with the aim of ending the war. On November 7 its de facto leader Deputy Chief of Staff Hayao Tada laid down an "operation restriction line" preventing its forces from leaving the vicinity of Shanghai, or more specifically from going west of the Chinese cities of Suzhou and Jiaxing.

However, a major rift of opinion existed between the Japanese government and its two field armies, the SEA and 10th Army, which as of November were both nominally under the control of the Central China Area Army led by SEA commander Matsui. Matsui made clear to his superiors even before he left for Shanghai that he wanted to march on Nanking. He was convinced that the conquest of the Chinese capital city of Nanking would provoke the fall of the entire Nationalist Government of China and thus hand Japan a quick and complete victory in its war on China. Yanagawa was likewise eager to conquer Nanking and both men chafed under the operation restriction line that had been imposed on them by the Army General Staff.

On November 19 Yanagawa ordered his 10th Army to pursue retreating Chinese forces across the operation restriction line to Nanking, a flagrant act of insubordination. When Tada discovered this the next day he ordered Yanagawa to stop immediately, but was ignored. Matsui made some effort to restrain Yanagawa, but also told him that he could send some advance units beyond the line. In fact, Matsui was highly sympathetic with Yanagawa's actions and a few days later on November 22 Matsui issued an urgent telegram to the Army General Staff insisting that "To resolve this crisis in a prompt manner we need to take advantage of the enemy's present declining fortunes and conquer Nanking ... By staying behind the operation restriction line at this point we are not only letting our chance to advance slip by, but it is also having the effect of encouraging the enemy to replenish their fighting strength and recover their fighting spirit and there is a risk that it will become harder to completely break their will to make war."

Meanwhile, as more and more Japanese units continued to slip past the operation restriction line, Tada was also coming under pressure from within the Army General Staff. Many of Tada's colleagues and subordinates, including the powerful Chief of the General Staff Operations Division Sadamu Shimomura, had come around to Matsui's viewpoint and wanted Tada to approve an attack on Nanking. On November 24 Tada finally relented and abolished the operation restriction line "owing to circumstances beyond our control", and then several days later he reluctantly approved the operation to capture Nanking. Tada flew to Shanghai in person on December 1 to deliver the order, though by then his own armies in the field were already well on their way to Nanking.

China's decision to defend Nanking
On November 15, near the end of the Battle of Shanghai, Chiang Kai-shek convened a meeting of the Military Affairs Commission's Supreme National Defense Council to undertake strategic planning, including a decision on what to do in case of a Japanese attack on Nanking. Here Chiang insisted fervently on mounting a sustained defense of Nanking. Chiang argued, just as he had during the Battle of Shanghai, that China would be more likely to receive aid from the great powers, possibly at the ongoing Nine Power Treaty Conference, if it could prove on the battlefield its will and capacity to resist the Japanese. He also noted that holding onto Nanking would strengthen China's hand in peace talks which he wanted the German ambassador Oskar Trautmann to mediate.

Chiang ran into stiff opposition from his officers, including the powerful Chief of Staff of the Military Affairs Commission He Yingqin, the Deputy Chief of Staff Bai Chongxi, the head of the Fifth War Zone Li Zongren, and his German advisor Alexander von Falkenhausen. They argued that the Chinese Army needed more time to recover from its losses at Shanghai, and pointed out that Nanking was highly indefensible topographically. The mostly gently sloping terrain in front of Nanking would make it easy for the attackers to advance on the city, while the Yangtze River behind Nanking would cut off the defenders' retreat.

Chiang, however, had become increasingly agitated over the course of the Battle of Shanghai, even angrily declaring that he would stay behind in Nanking alone and command its defense personally. But just when Chiang believed himself completely isolated, General Tang Shengzhi, an ambitious senior member of the Military Affairs Commission, spoke out in defense of Chiang's position, although accounts vary on whether Tang vociferously jumped to Chiang's aid or only reluctantly did so. Seizing the opportunity Tang had given him, Chiang responded by organizing the Nanking Garrison Force on November 20 and officially making Tang its commander on November 25. The orders Tang received from Chiang on November 30 were to "defend the established defense lines at any cost and destroy the enemy’s besieging force".

Though both men publicly declared that they would defend Nanking "to the last man", they were aware of their precarious situation. On the same day that the Garrison Force was established Chiang officially moved the capital of China from Nanking to Chongqing deep in China's interior. Further, both Chiang and Tang would at times give contradictory instructions to their subordinates on whether their mission was to defend Nanking to the death or merely delay the Japanese advance.

Road to Nanking

China's defense preparations
Following the Manchurian Incident of 1931, the Chinese government began a fast track national defense program with massive construction of primary and auxiliary air force bases around the capital of Nanking including Jurong Airbase, completed in 1934, from which to facilitate aerial defense as well as launching counter-strikes against enemy incursions; on 15 August 1937 the IJN launched the first of many heavy schnellbomber (fast bomber) raids against Jurong Airbase using the advanced G3Ms based upon Giulio Douhet's blitz-attack concept in an attempt to neutralize the Chinese Air Force fighters guarding the capital city, but was severely repulsed by the unexpected heavy resistance and performance of the Chinese fighter pilots stationed at Jurong, and suffering almost 50% loss rate.

On November 20 the Chinese Army and teams of conscripted laborers began to hurriedly bolster Nanking's defenses both inside and outside the city. Nanking itself was surrounded by formidable stone walls stretching almost  around the entire city.

The Fukuo Line, a sprawling network of trenches, moats, barbed wire, mine fields, gun emplacements, and pillboxes, was to be the final defense line outside Nanking's city walls. There were also two key high points of land on the Fukuo Line, the peaks of Zijinshan to the northeast and the plateau of Yuhuatai to the south, where fortification was especially dense.

The defending army, the Nanking Garrison Force, was on paper a formidable army of thirteen divisions, including three elite German-trained divisions plus the super-elite Training Brigade, but in reality most of these units had trickled back to Nanking severely mauled from the fighting in Shanghai. By the time they reached Nanking they were physically exhausted, low on equipment, and badly depleted in total troop strength. In order to replenish some of these units, 16,000 young men and teenagers from Nanking and the rural villages surrounding it were speedily pressed into service as new recruits. An additional 14,000 fresh soldiers were brought in from Hankou to fill the ranks of the 2nd Army. However, due to the unexpected rapidity of the Japanese advance, most of the new conscripts received only rudimentary training on how to fire their guns on their way to or upon their arrival at the frontlines. No definitive statistics exist on how many soldiers the Nanking Garrison Force had managed to cobble together by the time of the battle, but among leading estimates are those of David Askew who says 73,790 to 81,500, those of Ikuhiko Hata who estimates 100,000, and those of Tokushi Kasahara who argues in favor of about 150,000.

But during this period Japan's Navy Air Service was launching frequent air raids on the city, eventually totaling 50 raids according to the Navy's own records. The Imperial Japanese Navy Air Service had struck Nanking for the first time on August 15 with Mitsubishi G3M medium-heavy bombers, but suffered heavy losses in face of the aerial defense from Chinese Air Force Boeing P-26/281 Peashooter and Hawk II/Hawk III fighters based primarily at Jurong Airbase for the defense of Nanking. It wasn't until after the introduction of the advanced Mitsubishi A5M fighter did the Japanese begin to turn the tide in air-to-air combat, and proceed with bombing both military and civilian targets day and night with increasing impunity as the Chinese Air Force losses mounted through continuous attrition; the Chinese did not have the aircraft industry nor comprehensive training regimen to replace men and machines to contend against the ever-growing and ever-improving Japanese war machine. However, experienced veteran fighter pilots of the Chinese Air Force still proved a most dangerous adversary against Japanese air power; combat aces Col. Gao Zhihang, Maj. John Wong Pan-yang and Capt. Liu Cuigang whom were outnumbered by the superior A5Ms entering Nanking on October 12, famously shot down four A5M fighters that day including a double-kill by Col. Gao that included Shotai leader W.O. Torakuma. Tragically both Col. Gao and Capt. Liu were lost due to non-aerial combat incidents by the following month as they were preparing to receive improved fighter aircraft design in the Polikarpov I-16s. In the face of Japanese terror bombing and the ongoing advance of the Imperial Japanese Army, the large majority of Nanking's citizens fled the city, which by early December Nanking's population had dropped from its former total of more than one million to less than 500,000, a figure which included Chinese refugees from rural villages burned down by their own government's scorched earth policies. Most of those still in the city were very poor and had nowhere else to go. Foreign residents of Nanking were also repeatedly asked to leave the city which was becoming more and more chaotic under the strain of bombings, fires, looting by criminals, and electrical outages, but those few foreigners brave enough to stay behind strived to find a way to help the Chinese civilians who had been unable to leave. In late-November a group of them led by German citizen John Rabe established the Nanking Safety Zone in the center of the city, a self-proclaimed demilitarized zone where civilian refugees could congregate in order to hopefully escape the fighting. The safety zone was recognized by the Chinese government, and on December 8 Tang Shengzhi demanded that all civilians evacuate there.

Among those Chinese who did manage to escape Nanking were Chiang Kai-shek and his wife Soong Mei-ling, who had flown out of Nanking on a private plane just before the crack of dawn on December 7. The mayor of Nanking and most of the municipal government left the same day, entrusting management of the city to the Nanking Garrison Force.

Japan's march on Nanking
By the start of December, Japan's Central China Area Army had swollen in strength to over 160,000 men, though only about 50,000 of these would ultimately participate in the fighting. The plan of attack against Nanking was a pincer movement which the Japanese called "encirclement and annihilation". The two prongs of the Central China Area Army's pincer were the Shanghai Expeditionary Army (SEA) advancing on Nanking from its eastern side and the 10th Army advancing from its southern side. To the north and west of Nanking lay the Yangtze River, but the Japanese planned to plug this possible escape route as well both by dispatching a squadron of ships up the river and by deploying two special detachments to circle around behind the city. The Kunisaki Detachment was to cross the Yangtze in the south with the ultimate aim of occupying Pukou on the river bank west of Nanking while the Yamada Detachment was to be sent on the far north route with the ultimate aim of taking Mufushan just north of Nanking.

General Matsui, along with the Army General Staff, envisaged making a slow and steady march on Nanking, but his subordinates refused to play along and instead raced eagerly with each other to be the first to get to the city. For instance, the 10th Army captured the key town of Guangde on November 30 three days before it was even supposed to start its planned advance, and the SEA captured Danyang on December 2 more than five days ahead of schedule. In order to achieve such speeds, the Japanese soldiers carried little with them except weaponry and ammunition. Because they were marching well ahead of most of their supply lines they had to purchase or loot their food from Chinese civilians along the way.

During their advance the Japanese overcame initially light resistance from the already battered Chinese forces who were being pursued by the Japanese from Shanghai in a "running battle". Here the Japanese were aided by their complete air supremacy, their abundance of tanks, the improvised and hastily constructed nature of the Chinese defenses, and also by the Chinese strategy of concentrating their defending forces on small patches of relatively high ground which made them easy to outflank and surround.

On December 5, Chiang Kai-shek paid a visit to a defensive encampment near Jurong to boost the morale of his men but was forced to retreat when the Imperial Japanese Army began their attack on the battlefield. On that day the rapidly moving forward contingents of the SEA occupied Jurong and then arrived at Chunhuazhen, a key point of Nanking's outer line of defense which would put Japanese artillery in range of the city. Here China's 51st Division flung its main force into the fighting and repeatedly repulsed Japanese attacks before cracking on December 8 when the main force of the SEA arrived. The SEA also took the fortress at Zhenjiang and the spa town of Tangshuizhen on that day. Meanwhile, on the south side of the same defense line, armored vehicles of Japan's 10th Army charged the Chinese position at Jiangjunshan and Niushoushan defended by China's 58th Division. Valiant Chinese soldiers armed with hammers jumped onto the vehicles and banged repeatedly on their roofs shouting "Get out of there!", but after darkness fell on the battlefield the 58th Division was finally overwhelmed on December 9 after suffering, according to its own records, 800 casualties.

By December 9 Japan's forces had reached Nanking's last line of defense, the daunting Fukuo Line. At this point General Matsui had a "summons to surrender" drawn up which implored the Chinese to send military envoys to Nanking's Zhongshan Gate to discuss terms for the peaceful occupation of the city, and he then had a Mitsubishi Ki-21 scatter thousands of copies of the message over the city. On December 10 a group of Matsui's senior staff officers waited to see if the gate would be opened, but Tang Shengzhi had no intention of responding.

Later that day Tang proclaimed to his men that, "Our army has entered into the final battle to defend Nanking on the Fukuo Line. Each unit shall firmly defend its post with the resolve to either live or die with it. You're not allowed to retreat on your own, causing defense to collapse." The American journalist F. Tillman Durdin, who was reporting on site during the battle, saw one small group of Chinese soldiers set up a barricade, assemble in a solemn semicircle, and promise each other that they would die together where they stood.

Final battle for Nanking

At 1:00 pm on December 10, General Matsui ordered all units to launch a full-scale attack on Nanking. That day the SEA assaulted China's super-elite Training Brigade on the peaks of Zijinshan, which dominate Nanking's northeast horizon. Clambering up the ridges of the mountain, the men of the SEA had to painstakingly wrest control of each Chinese encampment one by one in bloody infantry charges. Advancing along the south side of Zijinshan was no easier as General Matsui had forbidden his men from using artillery there due to his deep conviction that no damage should come to its two famous historical sites, Sun Yat-sen Mausoleum and Ming Xiaoling Mausoleum.

Also on Nanking's eastern side but further south, other units of the SEA faced the difficult task of fording the large moat standing between them and three of the city gates, Zhongshan Gate, Guanghua Gate, and Tongji Gate, though the speed of Japan's earlier advance played in their favor as key Chinese units slated to be deployed here were not yet in position. That evening, Japanese engineers and artillerymen closing in on Guanghua Gate managed to blow a hole in the wall. A Japanese battalion launched a daring attack through the gap and planted a Japanese flag on a portion of the gate, but was immediately pinned down by a series of determined Chinese counterattacks. The Chinese brought up reinforcements, including tanks, and they poured down grenades and even flaming, gasoline-soaked lumber onto the Japanese battalion, which was only saved from annihilation by timely bursts of concentrated artillery fire from the rest of their division. The battalion succeeded in holding its position for the rest of the battle despite losing eighty of its eighty-eight men.

At the same time Japan's 10th Army was storming Yuhuatai, a rugged plateau situated directly in front of Zhonghua Gate on Nanking's southern side. The 10th Army's progress was slow and casualties were heavy as Yuhuatai was built like a fortress of interlocking pillboxes and trenches manned by three Chinese divisions, including the German-trained 88th Division, though the Chinese were also apt to counterattack and some Japanese units were forced to spend more time defending than attacking. Close to every single man that the 88th Division had deployed on Yuhuatai was killed in action, including three of its four regimental commanders and both of its brigade commanders, but in the process the Japanese were made to suffer 2,240 casualties including 566 dead. Yuhuatai was finally overrun at noon on December 12.

Behind Yuhuatai the 88th Division had stationed its barely trained new recruits atop Nanking's Zhonghua Gate. The Japanese had already tried the previous night to infiltrate a "suicide squadron" bearing explosive picric acid up to this gate to blow a hole in it, but it got lost in the morning fog and failed to reach the wall. At noon on December 12 a team of just six Japanese soldiers made it across the moat in a small boat and succeeded in scaling the wall at Zhonghua Gate on a shaky bamboo ladder and raising the Japanese flag there. Five of them were killed by gunfire but the last man grabbed a Chinese machine gun and held the position singlehandedly. Soon after another Japanese team set a fire in front of the gate to create a smokescreen. By 5:00 pm more and more Japanese troops were crossing the moat and swarming Zhonghua Gate by fording makeshift bridges so rickety their engineers had to hold them aloft with their own bodies, and with the help of some well aimed Japanese artillery fire from atop Yuhuatai parts of the wall finally crumbled. Meanwhile, just west of Zhonghua Gate, other soldiers also of Japan's 10th Army had punched a hole through Chinese lines in the wetlands south of Shuixi Gate and were launching a violent drive on that gate with the support of a fleet of tanks.

At the height of the battle Tang Shengzhi complained to Chiang that, "Our casualties are naturally heavy and we are fighting against metal with merely flesh and blood", but what the Chinese lacked in equipment they made up for in the sheer ferocity with which they fought, though this was partially due to strict orders that no man or unit was to retreat one step without permission. Over the course of the battle roughly 1,000 Chinese soldiers were shot dead by other members of their own army for attempting to retreat, and on Yuhuatai Japanese soldiers noticed that many Chinese pillboxes were chained from the outside to prevent their occupants from fleeing.

Nonetheless, the Japanese were gaining the upper hand over the hard-pressed and surrounded Chinese defenders. On December 12 the SEA captured Peak #2 of Zijinshan and from this vantage point unleashed a torrent of artillery fire at Zhongshan Gate where a large portion of the wall suddenly gave way. After sunset the fires that blazed out of control on Zijinshan were visible even from Zhonghua Gate in the south which was completely occupied by Japan's 10th Army on the night of December 12 to 13.

Collapse of the Nanking Garrison Force
Unbeknownst to the Japanese however, Chiang had already ordered Tang to abandon the defense. In spite of his earlier talk about holding out in Nanking to the bitter end, Chiang telegraphed an order to Tang on December 11 to abandon the city. Tang prepared to do so the next day on December 12, but startled by Japan's intensified onslaught he made a frantic last-minute bid to conclude a temporary ceasefire with the Japanese through German citizens John Rabe and Eduard Sperling. Only when it became clear that the negotiations could not be completed in time did Tang finally finish drawing up a plan calling for all his units to launch a coordinated breakout of the Japanese encirclement. They were to commence the breakout under cover of darkness at 11:00 pm that night and then muster in Anhui. Just after 5:00 pm on December 12 Tang arranged for this plan to be transmitted to all units, and then he crossed the Yangtze River, escaping through the city of Pukou on the opposite bank of the river less than twenty-four hours before it was occupied by Japan's Kunisaki Detachment.

By the time Tang slipped out of the city, however, the entire Nanking Garrison Force was rapidly disintegrating with some units in open flight. Furthermore, contact had already been lost with many units who thus never received Tang's message and continued to hold their positions as ordered, though even those that did receive it had little luck at slipping through the Japanese lines. China's 66th and 83rd Corps made a bid to evade the Japanese as planned through a gap to the east but immediately ran into their own minefield. After that they were attacked in flight by Japanese units and lost two divisional chiefs of staff in combat. Though the two corps had started the battle at least 11,000 men strong, only 600 of them escaped Nanking. Near dawn on December 13 a portion of China's 74th Corps was also annihilated in a bid to break through Japanese lines along the Yangtze River south of Nanking.

One of the few units that did manage to get out of Nanking was China's 2nd Army led by Xu Yuanquan situated just north of Nanking. Though Xu never received Tang's order to abandon the defense, on the night of December 12 he had heard that Nanking had been captured and so decided to withdraw on his own accord. During the night he managed to evacuate most of his unit across the Yangtze River just before Japanese naval units blockaded the river.

By contrast, a massive crowd of thousands of Chinese soldiers and civilians from the south side of Nanking, who were fleeing in panic and disarray from the advance of Japan's 10th Army on the same night, were prevented from reaching the harbor at Xiaguan by Chinese barrier troops who fired on the crowd for retreating without permission and managed to hold it back. At 9:00 pm a fleeing Chinese tank unit, which had also not received Tang's parting message, charged the barrier troops and burst through their blockade, only for the crowd to then find that there were hardly any boats remaining in the harbor. The crowd fought to clamber aboard what few craft were available, but these soon became so overloaded that they sank midway. The rest of the Chinese soldiers took to the Yangtze's rough and frigid waters en masse while clinging to logs and pieces of scrap lumber, though most were quickly swallowed up by the river. Furthermore, by this point the Japanese encirclement of Nanking was virtually complete and many who were attempting to brave the Yangtze soon found themselves being fired upon from both sides of the river. Others who saw this turned back to the city in despair.

Many of these tens of thousands of Chinese soldiers who could not escape the city responded by casting off their uniforms and weaponry, switching to civilian clothes often by stealing them from passersby, and then desperately seeking sanctuary in the Nanking Safety Zone by mingling with civilians. The American journalist F. Tillman Durdin "witnessed the wholesale undressing of an army that was almost comic". "Arms were discarded along with uniforms, and the streets became covered with guns, grenades, swords, knapsacks, coats, shoes and helmets ... In front of the Ministry of Communications and for two blocks further on, trucks, artillery, busses, staff cars, wagons, machine-guns, and small arms became piled up as in a junk yard."

Mopping-up operations and the Nanking Massacre

The fighting in Nanking did not end entirely on the night of December 12–13 when the Japanese Army took the remaining gates and entered the city. During their mopping-up operations in the city the Japanese continued for several more days to beat back sporadic resistance from Chinese stragglers. Though Mufushan, just north of Nanking, was taken by Japan's Yamada Detachment without much bloodshed on the morning of December 14, pockets of resistance outside Nanking persisted for several more days.

Meanwhile, the Japanese units on mopping-up duty in Nanking had decided that the former Chinese soldiers hiding in the city were a possible security risk and therefore carried out a thorough search of every building in Nanking and made frequent incursions into the Nanking Safety Zone in search of them. Japanese units attempted to distinguish former soldiers from civilians by checking if they had marks on their shoulders from wearing a backpack or carrying a rifle. However, the criteria used were often arbitrary as was the case with one Japanese company which apprehended all men with "shoe sores, callouses on the face, extremely good posture, and/or sharp-looking eyes" and for this reason many civilians were taken at the same time. What happened to the Chinese soldiers and civilians who were captured varied greatly from unit to unit, though many were summarily executed in an event that came to be known as the Nanking Massacre, which the foreign residents and journalists in Nanking made known internationally within days of the city's fall. The Japanese also committed random acts of murder, rape, looting, and arson during their occupation of Nanking. According to the International Military Tribunal for the Far East, indicate that the total number of civilians and prisoners of war murdered in Nanking and its vicinity during the first six weeks of the Japanese occupation was over 200,000 while 20,000 women were raped, including infants and the elderly. Estimates for the total death toll of the Nanking Massacre vary widely.

The Japanese Army's mopping-up operations and the large-scale massacres that accompanied them were over by the afternoon of December 17 when General Matsui entered Nanking for the victory parade. By the end of December most Japanese soldiers had left Nanking, though units of the Shanghai Expeditionary Army stayed on to occupy the city. The Nanking Self-Government Committee, a new municipal authority formed from local Chinese collaborators, was inaugurated on January 1, 1938, but it was not until February 25 that all restrictions on the free movement of civilians into and out of the city were lifted.

Aftermath and assessment

News of the massacre was tightly censored in Japan, where Nanking's capture provoked a frenzy of excitement among the citizenry. Mass celebrations of every sort, either spontaneous or government-sponsored, took place throughout the country, including a number of resplendent lantern parades which were still vividly remembered by onlookers several decades later. F. Tillman Durdin noted even before Nanking had fallen that "Events in the field have renewed the belief of the Japanese people in the invincibility of their arms."

The conquest of Nanking had been quicker and easier than the Japanese had foreseen; they lost only 1,953 soldiers in battle, plus 4,994 wounded. Japan's casualties were undoubtedly dwarfed by those of China, though no precise figures exist on how many Chinese were killed in action. The Japanese claimed to have killed up to 84,000 enemies during the Nanking campaign whereas a contemporary Chinese source claimed that their army suffered 20,000 casualties. Masahiro Yamamoto noted that the Japanese usually inflated their opponent's body counts while the Chinese had reason to downplay the scale of their loss. Ikuhiko Hata estimates that 50,000 Chinese soldiers were killed in combat during the entire battle whereas Jay Taylor puts the number at 70,000 and states that proportionate to the size of the force committed, such losses were greater than those suffered in the devastating Battle of Shanghai. On the other hand, Chinese scholar Sun Zhaiwei estimates Chinese combat losses at 6,000 to 10,000 men.

An official report of the Nationalist Government argued that an excess of untrained and inexperienced troops was a major cause of the defeat, but at the time Tang Shengzhi was made to bear much of the blame and later historians have also criticized him. Japanese historian Tokushi Kasahara, for instance, has characterized his battlefield leadership as incompetent, arguing that an orderly withdrawal from Nanking may have been possible if Tang had carried it out on December 11 or if he had not fled his post well in advance of most of his beleaguered units. However, Chiang's very decision to defend Nanking is also controversial. Masahiro Yamamoto believes that Chiang chose "almost entirely out of emotion" to fight a battle he knew he could only lose, and fellow historian Frederick Fu Liu concurs that the decision is often regarded as one of "the greatest strategical mistakes of the Sino-Japanese war". Still, the historian Jay Taylor notes that Chiang was convinced that to run from his capital city "without a serious fight ... would forever be regarded as a cowardly decision".

In spite of its military accomplishment, Japan's international reputation was blackened by the Nanking Massacre, as well as by a series of international incidents that occurred during and after the battle. Most notable among them were the shelling by Japanese artillery of the British steamship Ladybird on the Yangtze River on December 12, and the sinking by Japanese aircraft of the American gunboat Panay not far downstream on the same day. The Allison Incident, the slapping of an American consul by a Japanese soldier, further increased tensions with the United States.

Furthermore, the loss of Nanking did not force China to capitulate as Japan's leaders had predicted. Even so, buoyed by their victory, the Japanese government replaced the lenient terms for peace which they had relayed to the mediator Ambassador Trautmann prior to the battle with an extremely harsh set of demands that were ultimately rejected by China. On December 17 in a fiery speech entitled, "A Message to the People Upon Our Withdrawal from Nanking", Chiang Kai-shek defiantly declared that,
The outcome of this war will not be decided at Nanking or in any other big city; it will be decided in the countryside of our vast country and by the inflexible will of our people ... In the end we will wear the enemy down. In time the enemy's military might will count for nothing. I can assure you that the final victory will be ours.

The Second Sino-Japanese War was to drag on for another eight years and ultimately end with Japan's surrender in 1945.

See also
 Air Warfare of WWII from the Sino-Japanese War perspective
 Battle of Wuhan; the battle over the new wartime capital of China following the Fall of Nanjing
 Battle of Chongqing; the battle over the wartime capital of China following the Fall of Wuhan

References

Conflicts in 1937
1937 in China
1937 in Japan
Battles of the Second Sino-Japanese War
History of Nanjing
Articles containing video clips